Nowa Wieś  is a village in the administrative district of Gmina Purda, within Olsztyn County, Warmian-Masurian Voivodeship, in northern Poland. It is located within Warmia.

A historic church of Saint Joseph is located in Nowa Wieś.

References

Villages in Olsztyn County